Devon Mountain is a summit located North of the Clearwater River in Banff National Park, Alberta, Canada.

Devon Mountain was so named on account of Devonian rocks in the area.

See also 
 List of mountains in the Canadian Rockies

References

Mountains of Banff National Park
Three-thousanders of Alberta
Alberta's Rockies